Coming Down the Mountain is a 2007 British television film which was shown on BBC One, written by Mark Haddon (author of The Curious Incident of the Dog in the Night-Time) and directed by Julie Anne Robinson. The television film was based on a radio play also written by Haddon.

Plot
David and Ben Philips are teenage brothers who live in London. Ben has Down syndrome. David resents the protective attention his parents lavish on his younger brother and how much they rely on him to look after Ben. The family move from London to Derbyshire so that Ben can attend a special school, meaning David has to leave his friends and girlfriend, Gail, behind. Ben makes friends and finds a girl friend. David has difficulty fitting into his new school, suffering at the hands of bullies. David discovers that Gail has moved on from him only five weeks after their break up, which leads him to self-harm. David decides to kill his brother. He takes Ben hitchhiking without telling his parents, and they camp in Snowdonia. Climbing the mountain, David plans to murder Ben by pushing him off a high ridge. At the top, David changes his mind, but, following taunting by Ben, pushes him in a fit of rage. Ben survives the fall relatively uninjured, but goes to hospital. David kidnaps him from hospital, but Ben stands up to him.  He becomes the stronger character and, after an evening talking round the camp fire, David sees the real Ben for the first time and the brothers become reconciled. They both stand up to their parents' excessive molly coddling, so that both parents finally see Ben as a young adult, and family-life thus becomes far more relaxed and good-humoured. Ben explains that he has a girlfriend and wants to work on a farm. David writes to Alice - a girl he met while at Snowdonia - and the two bond.

Awards
Nominated for a BAFTA 2008
Winner of the RADAR People of the Year Human Rights Media AWARD 2008

Radio

In 2004, Haddon's original radio broadcast won Bronze for The Drama Award in the Sony Radio Academy Awards.

Cast
 Nicholas Hoult as David Philips
 Tommy Jessop as Ben Philips
 Emer Kenny as Gail
 Katie Griffiths as Alice
 Julia Ford as Shelia Philips
 Neil Dudgeon as John Philips
 Charlie Clapham as Greg
 Brendan Heaney as Gary Jeavons
 Josh Cohen as Rob
 Charlotte Grant as Abby
 Emon Hussain as Sunil
 Rajvinder Lali as Yasmin
 Joe Sproulle as Henry
 Jamie-Ray Hartshorne as Damon
 Lewis Snow as Kevin
 Samuel Gaukroger as Liam

References

External links
 BBC Official website and News article

Script extract from radio version
Mark Haddon's blog about it, from his own website
Why Haddon wanted to make the film, from The Guardian
 Nicholas Hoult on his role
Issues raised about Down's Syndrome
Interviews with Tommy Jessop in Times Online and with Mencap

Reviews

Telegraph
New Statesman

Guardian Unlimited
Digiguide Library
Broadcast
The Independent
icWales
Craegmore Healthcare
a2mediagroup
Times Online

2007 television films
2007 films
BBC television dramas
British television films
Down syndrome in television